Labiobarbus is a genus of cyprinid fish found in Southeast Asia. It currently contains nine described species.

Species
A total of 9 species have been assigned:
 Labiobarbus cyanopareja (Heckel, 1843)
 Labiobarbus fasciatus (Bleeker, 1853)
 Labiobarbus festivus (Heckel, 1843) (Signal barb)
 Labiobarbus lamellifer Kottelat, 1994
 Labiobarbus leptocheilus (Valenciennes, 1842)
 Labiobarbus lineatus (Sauvage, 1878)
 Labiobarbus ocellatus (Heckel, 1843)
 Labiobarbus sabanus (Inger & P. K. Chin, 1962)
 Labiobarbus siamensis (Sauvage, 1881)

References

 
Cyprinidae genera
Cyprinid fish of Asia
Taxa named by Johan Conrad van Hasselt